Aliaksandra Chepeleva (born 28 February 2003) is a Belarusian figure skater. She is a two-time Belrusian national champion (2018, 2019).

On the junior level, she is the 2018 Open Ice Mall Cup silver medalist.

References 

2003 births
Living people
Belarusian female single skaters
Figure skaters from Minsk